Bele may refer to:

 Bele language
 Bale Robe, town and separate woreda in south-central Ethiopia
 Bele (Wolaita), administrative centre of Kindo Koysha, woreda in Wolaita, Ethiopia
 Bele, Saint-Louis-du-Sud, Haiti, a village in the Aquin arrondissement of Haiti
 Jean Marie Okwo Bele (born 1957), Congolese physician
 Bele, a half-white, half-black character in "Let That Be Your Last Battlefield", an episode of Star Trek
 In the cult of Thuggee, a place for murdering travelers

See also
 Bélé, a folk song and dance from Dominica
 Bèlè, Haitian Creole spelling of "Bel Air" ("good air"), a neighborhood of Port-au-Prince, Haiti
 Beles (disambiguation)